The white-tailed antelope squirrel (Ammospermophilus leucurus) is a diurnal species of ground squirrel, scientifically classified in the order Rodentia and family Sciuridae, found in arid regions of the southwestern United States and the Baja California Peninsula of northwestern Mexico.

Distribution
The white-tailed antelope squirrel's geographical range extends north to south from southwestern Oregon to New Mexico, and east to west from western Colorado to Baja California, Mexico.

Home range and population density
Throughout much of the squirrel's range, especially in Utah, the population density fluctuates greatly, with periods of high density followed by periods of low density. Average population density also varies by season, with higher density in autumn relative to late spring.

Ecology
The white-tailed antelope squirrel is commonly spotted in arid habitats throughout the southwestern United States. Throughout this range, Ammospermophilus leucurus is omnivorous, feeding primarily on foliage (10%-60% of its diet), seeds (20%-50%), arthropods, and to a lesser extent, vertebrates (mainly lizards and rodents; predatory behavior by ground squirrels has been noted).  In conjunction with being a predator, the white-tailed antelope squirrel is also prey to many larger animals, including raptors, various canids, and snakes. These squirrels are not only preyed upon by large predators, but they also fall victim to many diverse ectoparasites. These include various ticks, fleas, mites, lice, and a couple species of parasitic larvae.

Behavior
Antelope squirrels are active most during the cooler parts of the daylight hours, avoiding midday as much as possible. Although these animals live in hot and arid climates, the white-tailed antelope squirrel is diurnal, meaning heat gain from metabolic activity could be a problem. However, compared to direct exposure of heat from the sun, metabolic heat gain contributes little to the overheating of this species. This diurnal activity pattern may be contributed to predation patterns. Selective pressures may have led to this species avoiding nighttime activity due to increased predation by nighttime predators. This behavior is controlled by the squirrels' natural circadian rhythms, and research has shown these rhythms to be highly important in keeping these diurnal activity patterns intact.

Reproduction

Timing
White-tailed antelope squirrels' reproductive receptiveness in females and reproductive capability in males peaks in early spring. It only takes the squirrels one year to become sexually mature and begin reproducing; typically, antelope ground squirrels will produce one large litter per year.

Geographical variation
Geographical factors, and thus environmental factors, weigh heavily on Ammospermophilus leucurus' reproductive cycle length and average litter size. Specifically, this variation is seen best when comparing the northern and southern extents of the antelope ground squirrels' distribution. In Oregon, which is the northernmost extent of the squirrels' range, reproductive cycles are relatively short, and the average litter size is 9.3. However, in Baja California, the southernmost extent of the squirrels' range, reproductive cycles last half of the year, and the average litter size is 5.9.

See also
Antelope squirrel

References

External links

Fauna of the Baja California Peninsula
Fauna of the Southwestern United States
Fauna of the Great Basin
Fauna of the Colorado Desert
Fauna of the Mojave Desert
Fauna of Gulf of California islands
Mammals described in 1889
Ammospermophilus
Taxa named by Clinton Hart Merriam